Jason Strout (born May 1, 1977) is an American former kickboxer and boxer from Roufusport competition team based in  Milwaukee, Wisconsin, United States.

Professional career 

Strout trained under Duke Roufus at the Duke Roufus Gym (Roufusport) in Milwaukee, Wisconsin from 1999-2003. After Strout retired from fighting, he moved to become a well-known head striking coach and co-owner of Church Street Boxing Gym located in New York City. Strout is known for being one of the top striking (boxing, kickboxing/Muay Thai) coaches in NYC with over 20 years of training experience. Strout has gathered knowledge first hand as a boxer and kickboxer under renowned coach Duke Roufus. Utilizing his experience, Strout has successfully coached professional and amateur boxers, kickboxers and MMA fighters in UFC, Bellator, Glory Kickboxing and many other promotions. In 2019, strout became an official announcer for "Fight Sports Asia: Absolute Muay Thai" which is broadcast on UFC Fight Pass. In 2020, Strout relocated back to the USA and now is currently coaching at Sanford MMA gym located in Deerfield Beach, Florida.

He has trained David Branch, Chris Romulo, Liam McGeary, Phillipe Nover, Jared Gordon, Wayne Barrett and Marcos Galvão.

See also
List of male kickboxers
Muay Thai
Boxing
World Kickboxing Association
International Kickboxing Federation
UFC
Bellator MMA
MMA

References

External links
  JasonStrout.com
  Eight Limbs Documentary
  Classic Boxing Fights
  Church Street Boxing Gym

Kickboxers from Wisconsin
Kickboxing trainers
American Muay Thai practitioners
American male kickboxers
Heavyweight kickboxers
Mixed martial arts trainers
1977 births
Living people
Sportspeople from Milwaukee